James McKie may refer to:

James McKie (footballer, born 1873) (1873–?), Scottish footballer who played in the 1890s for Southampton, Chatham and Dartford
James McKie (businessman) (1859–1910), Scottish businessman with Jardine, Matheson and Co.
James McKie (publisher) (1816–1891), Scottish publisher and collector of Robert Burns' works

See also
James McKee (disambiguation)
James Mackie (disambiguation)